BahnCard (German Bahn – Rail) is a discount subscription programme offered by Deutsche Bahn (DB), the German national railway company. Unlike airline loyalty programs, but similarly to the UK Railcard, the BahnCard entitles the passenger to a discount price and must be purchased prior to travel. 
The BahnCard is offered in a non-business and a business version called BahnCard Business.
Non-business BahnCard contracts are automatically renewed each year, unless they are cancelled with sufficient notice.
Three variants of BahnCard are sold by Deutsche Bahn: The BahnCard 25, the BahnCard 50, and the Mobility BahnCard 100. The first two variants allow passengers to get 25% and 50% discount respectively on standard long-distance rail fares, while the Mobility BahnCard 100 is a type of annual ticket that allows free unlimited travel on most of the German railway network for a fixed price.
The (non-business) BahnCard 25/50 are valid for one year and can only be purchased by subscription. If they are not canceled no later than six weeks before the expiry date, their term is automatically extended by another year.
BahnCard Business 25/50 are also valid for one year but require no cancellation.
Unlike the personal BahnCard, BahnCard Business can be combined with the discount that is granted to large-volume business customers.

In 2007 there were 4.01 million BahnCard holders in Germany (≈5% of Germany's population).
More than half of the passenger revenue of DB Fernverkehr (long-distance) comes from tickets sold to BahnCard holders.

Apart from entitling the holder to discounts, the BahnCard also functions as an ID card for the validation of online tickets and mobile phone tickets and for purchasing tickets from vending machines. BahnCard holders can also call a discounted hotline printed on the cards, and an optional travel insurance can be included.

Motivation

The main motivation for introducing the BahnCard was to increase competitiveness against the automobile. Prior to the BahnCard, Deutsche Bahn priced a trip between any two points related to the distance travelled; this pricing structure proved uncompetitive with driving.

The card allowed a two-dimensional pricing schedule, which consists of card price (a fixed cost), and ticket price (a variable cost). Once a passenger has bought a card, its price becomes a sunk cost and this makes the train more like the automobile, which is also characterised by high fixed costs. The decision whether to take a car or train for a particular journey depends mostly on the marginal price per kilometer, not on the total cost.

The effect of the BahnCard was to shift the marginal cost of the train journey below that of the car journey for many customers.

History

Predecessors: 1955-1992

A predecessor of the present-day BahnCard was introduced in 1955 by Franz-Josef Wuermeling, the then Minister for Family Affairs. Discounted train tickets became available for families with many children, and the eligibility pass became known as "The Wuermeling". This pass was offered until 1999.

In 1975 a Senior rail pass was introduced by the Bundesbahn, valid for men older than 65 years and women older than 60 years, and entitling them to a discount of 50% on long-distance train tickets. In the Deutsche Reichsbahn (DDR), the East German rail company, which was later merged with the Bundesbahn, normal student ID cards entitled students to a discount of 50% on all journeys and 75% if the journey was between home and university.

Introduction and growth: 1992-2002
The BahnCard itself was introduced on 1 October 1992.
Initially the card was available for second class travel and 50% discount only, but at Christmas 1992, the BahnCard First for the first class was launched along with gift vouchers for the new product. By the end of the year, it was bought by 650,000 clients. A major advertising campaign was started by the (then called) Bundesbahn, where the card was marketed under the slogan travel for a year for half the price. The TV advertising campaign for the new product won several awards.

The introduction of the BahnCard coincided with the launch of the high-speed InterCityExpress trains, a luxury service that gained wider customer acceptance than previous intercity trains. One million BahnCards were sold by 20 January 1993.

In July 1995, a BahnCard with credit card functionality was introduced in cooperation with Citibank. Two new versions were now offered in addition to the original card, a BahnCard with Visa payment and credit card function a BahnCard with Visa Electron payment (a rechargeable debit card). The credit card Bahncards were valid for a period of two years, and the regular card still for a period of one year. The validity of the cards was altered from the exact day to the end of a month. The new cards now also included a photograph of the customer. The DM 50 (€25) fee for replacement cards (in case of loss) was abolished, and a dining car voucher worth €5 was included with new cards. The customer data and photographs were processed in the US, which raised privacy concerns with some groups.

This campaign, called "better BahnCard", was criticised by the newspaper Die Zeit in June 1996, which reported that customers were tricked into buying the credit card version against their will and that organisational errors lead to delays of several months and the delivery of incorrect cards. In June 1996 the magazine Focus reported that "CitiBank must improve BahnCards". Despite a high-profile marketing campaign, customers largely rejected the "better BahnCard"; only 390,000 were sold by May 1996 instead of the projected 1.5 million. The partnership with CitiBank was terminated on 31 March 1999.

In 1995, the Rhein-Main-Verkehrsverbund was the first local public transport network outside Deutsche Bahn to join the BahnCard system. A 40% discount on all local train, tram and bus tickets was offered to BahnCard holders, and included in promotional tickets such as the Guten-Abend-Ticket. Long distance DB tickets with Frankfurt as a destination also allowed a single free connecting journey for non-BahnCard customers. In exchange, Rhein-Main-Verkehrsverbund customers were able to use Deutsche Bahn Interregio (regional) trains for free. Commuters who held season tickets of the Rhein-Main-Verkehrsverbund could now also use Intercity, Eurocity, and InterCityExpress trains in the Rhein-Main area for a small surcharge.

New tariff model and diversification: 2002-present

Towards the end of 2002, Deutsche Bahn undertook a major reform of its pricing strategy. The linear pricing model (where ticket prices were fixed and proportional to distance travelled) that had existed for over a century was partly replaced with a new model. Though the old fare system for standard tickets was kept largely unchanged, a degree of yield management was introduced for discounted tickets. As a part of this reform the discount offered to Bahncard holders was reduced from 50% to 25%. The justification was that the Bahncard discount was now valid on top of the new saver fares (called Plan-und-Spar) that offered discounts of up to 40% on the standard fares but were only available under certain conditions (non-exchangeable; booking more than 3 days in advance; return journey required; "weekeend rule"; limited number of seats).

This reform proved highly unpopular with customers. After passenger protests and declining passenger numbers, the pricing model was modified again in August 2003. The original 50% discount Bahncard was reintroduced alongside the 25% Bahncard, however its price was increased from €120 to €200.

On 14 December 2003 the City ticket (see below) was launched in 44 cities in cooperation with the Verband Deutscher Verkehrsunternehmen (Union of German Transport Operators), Deutsche Bahn, and the individual local transport companies. On 12 December 2004, another 13 cities joined the scheme; on 11 December 2005 (coinciding with the new DB timetable) another 19, on 1 April 2007 another 16, and on 10 December 2007 yet 7 more. 100 million rail tickets with "City-ticket" function were sold by the beginning of 2008.

Between 2004 and 2008 the number of BahnCard holders grew by one million to 4.01 million, the highest in the history of the card.

Current tariff structure

BahnCard 25

The BahnCard 25 also entitles the passenger to 25% discounts on top of fares already discounted, called (Super) Sparpreis, that are available under certain constraints such as advance purchase. It also entitles to group discounts, which are meant to make rail travel more attractive to groups of passengers who would have travelled by car otherwise.

BahnCard 100 customers receive a free Bahncard 25 for a partner or family member. Families can purchase additional Bahncard 25s for household members for about 1/5 of the price.  Minors can purchase a card for €10 that is valid for three years instead of one.

The number of BahnCard 25 holders is growing faster than the number of BahnCard 50 holders, and a Bahncard 25 passenger undertakes an average of 10 journeys a year, according to Deutsche Bahn.

BahnCard 50

The BahnCard 50 enables a 50% discount on standard walk-on fares called Flexpreis, and 25% discount on discounted fares called (Super) Sparpreis. It is aimed primarily at frequent travellers who want the convenience and flexibility of being able to hop on a train without making prior arrangements.

In 2006 there were 1.8 million BahnCard 50 in circulation, and BahnCard 50 passengers undertake an average of 50 train journeys a year, according to Deutsche Bahn.

The BahnCard 50 can be purchased for a concessionary price by students under 27 years of age.

BahnCard 100

The BahnCard 100 allows unlimited travel on the entire Deutsche Bahn network and 109 local public transport networks across Germany. The card itself is valid as a ticket; no additional paper ticket needs to be issued. Sleeper trains are excluded from the card, but can be used for a small surcharge.

The BahnCard 100 is aimed at business travellers and heavy train users who make more than 30 long-distance journeys a year. The Bahncard 100 automatically qualifies the passenger for Deutsche Bahn's VIP program called bahn.comfort. Card holders enjoy a number of privileges, like free baggage collection from home, and access to VIP lounges at train stations.

The car sharing service offered by Deutsche Bahn can be used at discounted rates by card holders. Some German employers issue the Bahncard 100 as a substitute for a company car and this function is intended to make the card a more attractive alternative.
An electronic key based on RFID technology is integrated into the card, which can be used to unlock carsharing vehicles parked near train stations. Since the RFID chip is automatically included in all cards, not only the ones with carsharing capability, and since the passenger's photograph is printed on the card, it has been criticised for violating privacy rights, and DB received the 2007 Big Brother Award as a result.

Mobility Card

Deutsche Bahn is in the process of expanding the Bahncard to a fully fledged "mobility card", offering discounts on other transport related services, such as hotel reservations, car rental, car sharing, public transport, bicycle hire, and other services.

+ City

The "+ City" is currently available in 118 German cities. BahnCard 100 holders are eligible for unlimited public transport travel in the City-ticket zone of participating cities, regardless of whether they book a DB long-distance journey or not. The text "+ City" is printed on the BahnCard 100, making it valid as a local transport ticket. In most participating cities, the BahnCard 100 is valid on the entire network (rail+bus+tram), in some it is valid beyond the city limits, and in some only for certain operators. In Hamburg the City-ticket is only valid in certain parts of the city, depending on what train station the passenger arrives in. In Frankfurt the City-ticket is only valid in the central tariff zone.

BahnCard and Bus operators
Many bus companies in Germany, including most of the regional bus routes operated by DB, accept the BahnCard if not traveling fully within the area of a Passenger Transport Executive. The same discount of 25% applies both to the BahnCard 25 and the BahnCard 50, and the Mobility BahnCard 100 is valid as a full ticket. The Deutsche Bahn-owned bus operators in Sachsen and Brandenburg do not accept the BahnCard.

Railplus
Since 9 December 2007 the Railplus function is automatically included in the price of the Bahncard 25/50, and have a RailPlus logo on the back of the card This allows passengers to purchase international walk-on fares tickets to 24 European countries with 15% discount, it does not matter whether trips start or cross the origin country of the RailPlus card. Before December 2007 this option was only available for journeys to Austria and Switzerland under the TEE Rail Alliance.

References

External links
 

Fare collection systems in Germany
Customer loyalty programs
Deutsche Bahn
Passenger rail transport in Germany